Gus Alex (April 1, 1916 – July 24, 1998) was a Greek-American mobster affiliated with the Chicago Outfit, who succeeded Jake Guzik and Murray Humphreys as the Outfit's main political briber and "fixer".

Early life
Alex's family came from the village of Alepochori in Achaea, Kingdom of Greece.

According to William F. Roemer,

Gus, being Greek, could not be 'made,' but he had done it all. His dad had operated a small restaurant at Wentworth and 26th in Armour Square/Chinatown, which was frequented by many members of the Capone, and then the Nitti, mob. Gus and Strongy [Ferraro] had worked in the restaurant from an early age. Both were sharp guys and came to the attention of the boys. Gus had, therefore, been one of them almost since birth.

Working primarily for Al Capone's Jewish-American associate, Jake Guzik, Alex would later become his protégé as he rose through the ranks of the Chicago crime family. By 1930, he was suspected in the deaths of at least five unsolved murder cases. Two of the alleged victims, later dying of their injuries in hospital, identified Alex as their assailant as well as three others who were killed after reporting to police extortion and death threats sent by Alex.

From Guzik's protege to Syndicate fixer 
Under Guzik's guidance, Alex became experienced in securing Syndicate protection through bribery of city officials. By the mid-1940s, Alex was the main liaison between the Chicago Outfit and city hall officials. He granted control of the Loop's illegal gambling and prostitution operations, including a lucrative call girl operation out of prominent downtown hotels (of which many call girls were paid up to $500 to $1,000) Alex's operations brought in an estimated $1 million a month for the Syndicate.

Described as "one of the wiliest and slickest crooks" within the Chicago Outfit, Alex would decline to answer questions under the Fifth Amendment over 39 times during his appearance before the Permanent Subcommittee on Investigations of the U.S. Senate Committee on Government Operations. During the 1960s, Alex would come under suspicion during his annual ski trips to Switzerland as the US government accused Alex of depositing Outfit money in unnumbered Swiss bank accounts. As a result of the US government's protest (although Illinois Senator Everett Dirksen and Congressman William L. Dawson opposed government action, calling to allow Alex to continue his "sporting trips"), Swiss officials banned Alex from entering Switzerland for 10 years.

Later years
Remaining a high-ranking member of the Chicago Outfit for over 30 years, Alex would retain his position throughout the reigns of Felice "Paul 'The Waiter' Ricca" DeLucia, Antonino "Tony," "Joe Batters" Accardo, and Salvatore "Sam," "Mooney" Giancana. Alex would continue to consolidate his political influence during the 1970s and 1980s not only within Chicago but expanding into the state capital Springfield, Illinois. An invaluable resource, Alex's political connections would ensure his position with the organization during the unstable leadership of the decade.

During Outfit leader Joseph "Joey Doves" Aiuppa's imprisonment, Alex would share overseeing day-to-day activities with underboss Samuel "Wings" Carlisi (being supervised by former leader Accardo, based in Palm Springs, California).

Alex was convicted for the first time at the age of seventy-six when a federal jury found him guilty of approving violent extortions of successful businessmen on October 1, 1992. Sentenced to fifteen years and eight months' imprisonment and a $823,000 fine in February 1993, he died of a heart attack in federal prison at Lexington, Kentucky aged eighty-two on July 24, 1998 after Leonard "Lenny" Patrick, a close Outfit associate, wore a "wire" and taped Alex for the FBI.

Quote
 On Las Vegas casinos:

It's a sucker's game. You can't win out there, you understand. We got the percentages rigged all in our favor. The longer you stay, the more you play, the more chances you got of losing. I don't let nobody around me who gambles. A couple thousand, okay, but no gambling!

References

Further reading
Binder, John J. The Chicago Outfit. Chicago: Arcadia Publishing, 2003.
Demaris, Ovid. Captive City, New York, Lyle Stuart Inc. 1969
Moldea, Dan E. Dark Victory: Ronald Reagan, MCA, and the Mob. New York: Penguin Books, 1987
Giancana, Sam and Chuck. Double Cross: The Explosive, Inside Story of the Mobster Who Controlled America. New York: Warner Books, 1992.
Kelly, Robert J. Encyclopedia of Organized Crime in the United States. Westport, Connecticut: Greenwood Press, 2000. 
Sifakis, Carl. The Mafia Encyclopedia. New York: Da Capo Press, 2005.

External links
United States of America vs. Mario J. Rainone, Gus Alex, and Nicholas Gio 
Gus Alex, 82, Syndicate Boss For Nearly 50 Years by John O'Brien

1916 births
1998 deaths
American gangsters of Greek descent
Chicago Outfit mobsters
American crime bosses
American people who died in prison custody
Prisoners who died in United States federal government detention
Mafia extortionists